The Art Directors Club Hall of Fame was established in 1971, by the Art Directors Club of New York, a professional organization in the design and creative industries. The Art Directors Club selects its honorees from those "who have made significant contributions to art direction and visual communications, and whose lifetime achievements represent the highest standards of creative excellence."

In addition to designers usually notable within the communities of design and advertising, the honorees include more popular artists who have affected the broader field of visual culture, including, for example, Issey Miyake, Jim Henson and Andy Warhol.

On its website, the Art Directors Club maintains a biography of each of the Hall of Fame honorees.

In a video shown at the 2010 Hall of Fame gala, George Lois speaks a little bit about the award and its history. In the video, Lois calls the Hall of Fame honors "the Oscars of the advertising business."

2010s

2012

The 2012 Hall of Fame Benefit Gala was held on October 5, 2012, in Manhattan.

 Barry Blitt
 David Droga
 Mary Ellen Mark
 Kevin O'Callaghan
 Deborah Sussman

2011

The 2011 black-tie gala was held on November 10, 2011, and was emceed by Steve Heller. Christoph Niemann provided illustrations for publicity of the Hall of Fame gala and associated exhibition.  Jennica Johnstone designed the invitations and associated assets.

 Ruth Ansel, 2011
 Marshall Arisman, 2011
 John C Jay, 2011
 Joe Pytka, 2011
 Paola Antonelli, 2011

2010
The 2010 Hall of Fame gala was held on Thursday, November 4, 2010, at the Art Directors Club on West 29th Street.
Pentagram designed the invitations for the 2010 Hall of Fame gala ceremony, using Matthew Carter's Carter Sans typeface.

 Fabien Baron, 2010
 Matthew Carter, 2010
 Philip Hays, 2010
 Jessica Helfand and William Drenttel, 2010
 George Nelson, 2010
 Christoph Niemann, 2010
 Dan Wieden, 2010
 Brigitte Lacombe, 2010

2000s

2008
Six Hall of Fame laureates were inducted at a black-tie gala at the ADC Gallery in New York on November 6, 2008. The benefit gala was emceed by John Hockenberry and was one part of a week of activities all taking place at the ADC Gallery.

 Alex Bogusky, 2008 
 Sir John Hegarty, 2008
 Ray Eames, 2008
 Maira Kalman, 2008
 John Maeda, 2008
 R. Roger Remington, 2008
 Bruce Weber, 2008

2006
2006's Hall of Fame laureates were inducted at a gala black-tie dinner at the ADC Gallery in New York on Thursday, October 12.

 Janet Froelich, 2006
 Issey Miyake, 2006
 Nicholas Negroponte, 2006
 Nancy Rice, 2006
 Art Spiegelman, 2006
 Bert Stern, 2006

2004
 Jerry Andelin, 2004 
 Jay Chiat, 2004 
 Muriel Cooper, 2004 
 Louise Fili, 2004 
 Al Hirschfeld, 2004 
 Bruce McCall, 2004 
 Duane Michals, 2004 
 Edward Tufte, 2004 
 Tibor Kalman, 2004

2003
 Michael Bierut, 2003 
 André François, 2003 
 David Kennedy, 2003 
 Richard Saul Wurman, 2003

2001–2002
 Rich Silverstein, 2001–2002 
 Giorgio Soavi, 2001–2002 
 Edward Sorel, 2001–2002 
 Philip Meggs, 2001–2002

2000
 Edward Benguiat, 2000 
 Pablo Ferro, 2000 
 Joe Sedelmaier, 2000 
 Tadanori Yokoo, 2000

1990s

1999
 R. O. Blechman, 1999 
 Annie Leibovitz, 1999 
 Stan Richards, 1999 
 Richard Wilde, 1999

1998
 Tom Geismar, 1998 
 Chuck Jones, 1998 
 Paula Scher, 1998 
 Alex Steinweiss, 1998 
 Red Burns, 1998

1997
 Allan Beaver, 1997 
 Sheila Metzner, 1997 
 B. Martin Pedersen, 1997 
 George Tscherny, 1997

1996
 Bill McCaffery, 1996 
 Erik Nitsche, 1996 
 Arnold Varga, 1996 
 Fred Woodward, 1996 
 Steve Heller, 1996

1995
 Robert Brownjohn, 1995 
 Paul Davis, 1995 
 Jay Maisel, 1995 
 Roy Kuhlman, 1995

1994
 Alan Fletcher, 1994 
 Norman Rockwell, 1994 
 Ikko Tanaka, 1994 
 Rochelle Udell, 1994 
 Andy Warhol, 1994

1993
 Leo Burnett, 1993 
 Yusaku Kamekura, 1993 
 Robert Wilvers, 1993 
 Howard Zieff, 1993

1992
 Eiko Ishioka, 1992 
 Rick Levine, 1992 
 Onofrio Paccione, 1992 
 Gordon Parks, 1992

1991
 Jim Henson, 1991 
 Bea Feitler, 1991 
 Bob Gill, 1991 
 Bob Giraldi, 1991 
 Richard Hess, 1991

1990
 Robert Weaver, 1990 
 Lee Clow, 1990 
 Reba Sochis, 1990 
 Frank Zachary, 1990

1980s

1989
 Rudolph de Harak, 1989 
 Herschel Levit, 1989 
 Raymond Loewy, 1989

1988
The New York Times reported that three inductees were to be honored on the evening of October 21, 1988. The Art Directors Club listing of Hall of Fame honorees includes those three inductees and a fourth, Silas Rhodes.

 Silas Rhodes, 1988 
 Ben Shahn, 1988
 Bert Steinhauser, 1988
 Mike Tesch, 1988

1987
The New York Times reported that four inductees were to be honored on the evening of October 23, 1987, at the Waldorf Astoria in New York. The Art Directors Club listing of Hall of Fame honorees includes those four inductees and a fifth, Leon Friend.

 Willy Fleckhaus, 1987
Leon Friend, 1987
 Shigeo Fukuda, 1987
 Steve Horn, 1987
 Tony Palladino, 1987

1986
 Walt Disney, 1986 
 Roy Grace, 1986 
 Alvin Lustig, 1986 
 Arthur Paul, 1986

1985
 Art Kane, 1985 
 Len Sirowitz, 1985 
 Charles Tudor, 1985

1984
 Charles Eames, 1984 
 Wallace Elton, 1984 
 Sam Scali, 1984 
 Louis Silverstein, 1984

1983
 Bill Bernbach, 1983 
 Aaron Burns, 1983 
 Seymour Chwast, 1983 
 Steve Frankfurt, 1983

1982
According to an article in The New York Times, the 1982 Hall of Fame laureates were inducted at a dinner at the Pierre Hotel in November 1982 in Manhattan.

 Richard Avedon, 1982
 Amil Gargano, 1982
 Jerome Snyder, 1982
 Massimo Vignelli, 1982

1981
According to The New York Times, the 1981 Hall of Fame laureates were inducted at an event at the Pierre Hotel.

 Lucian Bernhard, 1981
 Ivan Chermayeff, 1981
 György Kepes, 1981
 George Krikorian, 1981
 William Taubin, 1981

1980
 Gene Federico, 1980 
 Otto Storch, 1980 
 Henry Wolf, 1980

1970s

1979
 W. A. Dwiggins, 1979 
 George Giusti, 1979 
 Milton Glaser, 1979 
 Helmut Krone, 1979 
 Willem Sandberg, 1979 
 Ladislav Sutnar, 1979 
 Jan Tschichold, 1979

1978
 Thomas M. Cleland, 1978 
 Louis Dorfsman, 1978 
 Allen Hurlburt, 1978 
 George Lois, 1978

1977
 Saul Bass, 1977 
 Herb Lubalin, 1977 
 Bradbury Thompson, 1977

1976
 E. McKnight Kauffer, 1976 
 Herbert Matter, 1976

1975
 Gordon Aymar, 1975 
 Herbert Bayer, 1975 
 Cipe Pineles Burtin, 1975 
 Heyworth Campbell, 1975 
 Alexander Liberman, 1975 
 László Moholy-Nagy, 1975

1974
 Will Burtin, 1974 
 Leo Lionni, 1974 
 Edward McCabe, 1974 
 Shirley Polykoff, 1974

1973
 Charles Coiner, 1973 
 Paul Smith, 1973 
 Jack Tinker, 1973

1972
 M.F. Agha, 1972 
 Lester Beall, 1972 
 Alexey Brodovitch, 1972 
 A. M. Cassandre, 1972 
 Rene Clarke, 1972 
 Robert Gage, 1972 
 William Golden, 1972 
 Paul Rand, 1972

See also
 List of AIGA medalists
 Masters Series (School of Visual Arts)

References

Design awards